Nike Community, in Enugu East, Enugu State Nigeria. It has borders with Nsukka, Ebonyi and Enugu North and is one of the state's largest zones, featuring several tourist sites and commercial areas, including Nikelake Hotels. The community is under the monarchical leadership of HRM, IGWE. NNAJI. The region comprises 24 villages. They are subject to the authority of Enugu East of Enugu state, Nigeria.

Legend claims that Nike was biologically-related to Egede and Affa and it was assumed they came from the same mother, Ugwunye.  Ugwunye was said to have been a very beautiful woman married to the god Awuwa. Ugwunye gave birth to Anike at Nike, left Awuwa and married Ukwu. She then gave birth to Egede and thereafter married Eze Achala Ukwu. That led to the birth at Ikolo who was named Affa. From the narration, Anike Nwa Awuwa, was the child of Awuwa and Ugwunye. It happened that Anike married Aho-Ojoma, a deity, in Nokpa. They had 11 children; Ibagwa was the eldest.

The Ogui Nike is another area of the Nike Community. Those inhabitants were allegedly descendants of refugees from one of the Udi plateau villages. They were believed to have moved from Akegbe to settle at Ugwueke, to help Nike in its battle against Okpatu.

Senator Gilbert Emeka Nnaji is a notable son and politician representing Enugu East and Nike community in the upper chambers of the Nigerian Senate.

References

Populated places in Enugu State